Timothy John Caldwell (born February 4, 1954, in Brattleboro, Vermont) is an American former cross-country skier who competed from 1972 to 1984. He is the eldest son of Olympic cross-country skiing veteran John H. Caldwell.

Competing in four Winter Olympics, he earned his best finish of sixth in the 4 × 10 km relay at the 1976 Winter Olympics in Innsbruck. Caldwell also finished 15th in the 50 km event at the 1982 FIS Nordic World Ski Championships in Oslo. His best World Cup finish was second in a 15 km event in the United States in 1983.

Cross-country skiing results
All results are sourced from the International Ski Federation (FIS).

Olympic Games

World Championships

World Cup

Season standings

Individual podiums
 1 podium

References

Further reading

External links
 
 New Hampshire Bar Association profile of Caldwell

1954 births
American male cross-country skiers
Sportspeople from Vermont
Cross-country skiers at the 1972 Winter Olympics
Cross-country skiers at the 1976 Winter Olympics
Cross-country skiers at the 1980 Winter Olympics
Cross-country skiers at the 1984 Winter Olympics
The Putney School alumni
Dartmouth College alumni
Living people
Olympic cross-country skiers of the United States